Liu Chengming (born 20 March 1987) is a Paralympian athlete from China competing mainly in T54 classification sprint events.

Athletics career
Liu first represented China as a wheelchair racer at the 2010 Asian Para Games in Guangzhou, winning an individual gold in the 400m (T54) and a team gold with the men's 4 × 400 m relay (T53/54). The next year he competed at the 2011 IPC Athletics World Championships in Christchurch, New Zealand. In Christchurch he took two more gold medals, again in the 400m sprint and the men's 4 × 400 m (T53/54).

The next year Liu appeared at his first Summer Paralympic, the 2012 Games in London. He was again part of the Chinese team that took gold in the men's 400 metre relay, and also won an individual medal; bronze in the 100m sprint. Further success came at the 2015 World Championships in Doha, with a relay gold and two individual medals a gold in the 800m race and a silver in the 400m sprint.

Personal history
Liu was born in Chaoyang, China in 1987. When he was six months old Liu contracted polio which resulted in muscle atrophy in his legs.

Notes

Paralympic athletes of China
Athletes (track and field) at the 2012 Summer Paralympics
Athletes (track and field) at the 2016 Summer Paralympics
Paralympic gold medalists for China
Paralympic silver medalists for China
Living people
1987 births
Medalists at the 2012 Summer Paralympics
Medalists at the 2016 Summer Paralympics
Chinese male sprinters
People from Chaoyang, Liaoning
Chinese male wheelchair racers
Runners from Liaoning
Paralympic medalists in athletics (track and field)
21st-century Chinese people
Medalists at the 2010 Asian Para Games
Medalists at the 2014 Asian Para Games